The Burraubach is a river in the Sigmaringen district in Baden-Württemberg, Germany. It flows for about 5.7 kilometres. It flows into the Kehlbach near Pfullendorf.

See also 
List of rivers of Baden-Württemberg

References

External links 
 

Rivers of Baden-Württemberg
Rivers of Germany